Alex James Peters (born 31 March 1994) is an English cyclist, who last rode for UCI Continental team Ribble Weldtite.

Career

In July 2015 it was announced that he would join  as a stagiaire for the rest of 2015, becoming a fully fledged team member on 1 January 2016.

Major results

2011
 4th Road race, National Junior Road Championships
2012
 1st Overall National Junior Road Series
 1st Stage 1 (ITT) Junior Tour of Wales
2014
 1st  Overall Tour of the Reservoir
1st Stage 1
 2nd Overall Rás Tailteann
1st  Young rider classification
2015
 2nd Overall Tour de Normandie
1st  Young rider classification
 7th Overall Tour de Bretagne
1st Stage 4
 9th Flèche Ardennaise
2016
 6th Japan Cup
2021
 1st Ryedale Grand Prix

References

External links

1994 births
Living people
British male cyclists
English male cyclists
People from Hackney Central